The 2014 United States Senate election in Louisiana was held on November 4, 2014, to elect a member of the United States Senate to represent the State of Louisiana. As no candidate won a majority of the vote, a runoff was held on December 6, 2014.

Incumbent Democratic Senator Mary Landrieu ran for re-election to a fourth term in office against Republican U.S. Representative Bill Cassidy and several other candidates.

Under Louisiana's jungle primary system, all candidates appear on the same ballot, regardless of party and voters may vote for any candidate, regardless of their party affiliation. Louisiana is the only state that has a jungle primary system (California and Washington have a similar "top two primary" system). Since no candidate received a majority of the vote in the primary election, a runoff election was held on December 6 between the top two candidates, Landrieu and Cassidy.

In the December 6 runoff, Cassidy defeated Landrieu by 56% to 44%, settling the fate of the final Senate seat of the 2014 midterm elections and becoming the first Republican to hold this seat since the end of Reconstruction. Cassidy's victory gave the Republicans 54 seats in the 114th Congress,  and marked the first time since the resignation of William Pitt Kellogg in 1872 that both of Louisiana's Senate seats were held by Republicans.

Background 
Elections in Louisiana, with the exception of U.S. presidential elections, follow a variation of the open primary system called the jungle primary. Candidates of any and all parties are listed on one ballot; voters need not limit themselves to the candidates of one party. Unless one candidate takes more than 50% of the vote in the first round, a run-off election is then held between the top two candidates, who may in fact be members of the same party. This scenario occurred in the 7th District congressional race in 1996, when Democrats Chris John and Hunter Lundy made the runoff for the open seat, and in 1999, when Republicans Suzanne Haik Terrell and Woody Jenkins made the runoff for Commissioner of Elections.

Candidates

Democratic Party

Declared 
 Wayne Ables
 Mary Landrieu, incumbent U.S. Senator
 Vallian Senegal
 William Waymire, retired Marine

Withdrew 
 Raymond Brown, minister, civil rights activist and candidate for the U.S. Senate in 1998 and 2002 (endorsed Landrieu)

Declined 
 Edwin Edwards, former Governor of Louisiana and former U.S. Representative (running for LA-06)

Republican Party

Declared 
 Bill Cassidy, U.S. Representative
 Thomas Clements, small business owner
 Rob Maness, retired U.S. Air Force Colonel

Withdrew 
 Paul Hollis, state representative

Declined 
 Scott Angelle, member of the Louisiana Public Service Commission and former Lieutenant Governor of Louisiana
 Charles Boustany, U.S. Representative
 Jay Dardenne, Lieutenant Governor of Louisiana
 John Fleming, U.S. Representative
 Elbert Guillory, state senator
 Bobby Jindal, Governor of Louisiana
 Jeff Landry, former U.S. Representative
 Tony Perkins, president of the Family Research Council, former state representative and candidate for the U.S. Senate in 2002
 Phil Robertson, reality television star
 Buddy Roemer, former governor of Louisiana, former U.S. Representative and candidate for President of the United States in 2012
 Chas Roemer, president of the Louisiana Board of Elementary and Secondary Education and son of former governor Buddy Roemer
 Steve Scalise, U.S. Representative
 Alan Seabaugh, state representative

Libertarian Party

Declared 
 Brannon McMorris, electrical engineer

Jungle primary

Debates 
 Complete video of debate, October 14, 2014
 Complete video of debate, October 29, 2014

Endorsements

Polling 

Jungle primary

 ^ Internal poll for John Fleming Campaign

Republican primary

Results

Runoff

Debates 
 Complete video of debate, December 1, 2014

Predictions

Polling

Results

See also 
 2014 United States Senate elections
 2014 United States elections

References

External links 
 Elections Division from the Louisiana Secretary of State
 U.S. Senate elections in Louisiana, 2014 at Ballotpedia
 Campaign contributions at OpenSecrets
 Mary Landrieu for Senate
 Bill Cassidy for Senate

United States Senate
Louisiana
2014